Evelina Paoli (1878–1972) was an Italian stage and film actress.

Selected filmography
 Venus (1932)
 One Night with You (1932)
 The Joker King (1935)
 They've Kidnapped a Man (1938)
 Dora Nelson (1939)
 Idyll in Budapest (1941)
 A Garibaldian in the Convent (1942)
 We the Living (1942)
 Farewell Love! (1943)
 L'abito nero da sposa (1945)
 Baron Carlo Mazza (1948)
 The Charterhouse of Parma (1948)

References

Bibliography
 Goble, Alan. The Complete Index to Literary Sources in Film. Walter de Gruyter, 1999.

External links

1878 births
1972 deaths
Italian stage actresses
Italian film actresses
Actors from Florence